Fàn Jie (born October 25, 1976 in Beijing) is a female Chinese handball player who competed at the 2004 Summer Olympics.

In 2004, she finished eighth with the Chinese team in the women's competition, playing all seven matches as goalkeeper. She is a member of the Fàn family.

External links
profile  

1976 births
Living people
Chinese female handball players
Handball players at the 2004 Summer Olympics
Olympic handball players of China
Sportspeople from Beijing
Handball players at the 1998 Asian Games
Asian Games competitors for China